is a hotel chain in the Philippines managed and owned by the Global Comfort Group Corporation, which also owns the Icon Hotel and Eurotel hotel chains. Currently, the hotel group has 34 hotels over Metro Manila and 8 in other provinces. The hotel generally display a lodging with a Japanese theme.

History
Hotel Sogo was established by two individuals in 1992. One was a hotel professional who was involved in the hotel industry for 20 years and the other was a commercial developer and a contractor with an "AAA" license. The word "Sogo" was included as part of the hotel's chain name which mean "harmony" and adopted a Japanese theme. In the Philippines, the hotel brand brought many innovation to the hospitality industry by introducing free wifi, giving skateboards to the floor personnel, and launching a 24/7 call center.

In 2016, Hotel Sogo launched the hoverboard-based service. The waiters of the hotel chain are using the self-balancing two-wheel electrical motorized boards, locally known as hoverboard for F&B drive-in services. In February 2019, Hotel Sogo launched a new, simpler designed throughout its branded locations.

Branches 
As of February 2019, the Global Comfort Group Corp manages 39 Hotel Sogo branches in the country.

References

1992 introductions
Hotel chains in the Philippines
Hotels in Metro Manila
1992 establishments in the Philippines